Leigh Osborne (born 13 March 1990) is a professional Australian rules football player at the Gold Coast Football Club in the Australian Football League (AFL). He was recruited by the club in the 2013 Rookie Draft, with pick #2. Osborne made his debut in Round 22, 2013, against  at Docklands Stadium.

Statistics
 

|- style="background-color: #EAEAEA"
! scope="row" style="text-align:center" | 2013
|
| 41 || 1 || 0 || 0 || 4 || 5 || 9 || 3 || 1 || 0.0 || 0.0 || 4.0 || 5.0 || 9.0 || 3.0 || 1.0
|- class="sortbottom"
! colspan=3| Career
! 1
! 0
! 0
! 4
! 5
! 9
! 3
! 1
! 0.0
! 0.0
! 4.0
! 5.0
! 9.0
! 3.0
! 1.0
|}

References

External links

1990 births
Living people
Gold Coast Football Club players
Australian rules footballers from Victoria (Australia)
Frankston Football Club players